Steven Edward Colyer (born February 22, 1979) is a retired Major League Baseball relief pitcher. Colyer most recently played for the Atlanta Braves. He attended Meramec Community College and was drafted in the 2nd round of the 1997 Major League Baseball draft by the Los Angeles Dodgers. He has also played for the Detroit Tigers.

External links

1979 births
Living people
Atlanta Braves players
Detroit Tigers players
Los Angeles Dodgers players
Major League Baseball pitchers
Baseball players from St. Louis
Yakima Bears players
Vero Beach Dodgers players
Jacksonville Suns players
Las Vegas 51s players
Toledo Mud Hens players
Norfolk Tides players
Tulsa Drillers players
STLCC Archers baseball players
Colorado Springs Sky Sox players
Richmond Braves players